Sphaeristerium (Latin; from the Greek σφαιριστήριον; from σφαῖρα, ball) is a term in Classical architecture given to a large open space connected with the Roman thermae for exercise with balls after the bather had been anointed.  They were also provided in Roman villas.

Sports 
 

In Italian sferisterio is nowadays the courtfield for tamburello and two different pallone varieties: pallone col bracciale and pallone elastico. These are rectangular smooth grounds with a high wall on one of the long sides.

References

 Information pertinent to Macerata's sferisterio 

Ancient Roman architectural elements
Sport in ancient Rome